Franz Koehn was a German art director. He worked designing sets for the German film industry, mainly during the Nazi era.

Selected filmography
 The Private Secretary (1931)
 The Typist (1931)
 The Traitor (1936)
 My Son the Minister (1937)
 Frau Sixta (1938)
 Congo Express (1939)
 The False Step (1939)
 Kohlhiesel's Daughters (1943)
 The Marriage of Figaro (1949)
 Heart of Stone (1950)

References

Bibliography 
 Giesen, Rolf.  Nazi Propaganda Films: A History and Filmography. McFarland, 2003.

External links 
 

1889 births
Year of death unknown
People from Pomerania
German art directors